The Old Plover Methodist Church is located in Plover, Wisconsin. It was added to the National Register of Historic Places in 1980.

History
The church was built around 1857 by a Presbyterian congregation in the Greek Revival style. In 1866, it was sold to a Methodist congregation who used it until 1963.  The building is now the oldest remaining church building in Portage County and is a museum of the Portage County Historical Society.

References

Further reading
 The Portage County Historical Society link above leads to some photos, current and historic.

Churches on the National Register of Historic Places in Wisconsin
Methodist churches in Wisconsin
Churches in Portage County, Wisconsin
Museums in Portage County, Wisconsin
National Register of Historic Places in Portage County, Wisconsin